Crawford Lake is a lake near the community of Campbellville, in the town of Milton, Regional Municipality of Halton, Ontario, Canada. It is located within Crawford Lake Conservation Area, a Regionally Environmentally Sensitive Area, an Ontario Area of Natural and Scientific Interest, and part of the Niagara Escarpment World Biosphere Reserve.

The primary inflow to the lake is an unnamed creek.

Crawford Lake is meromictic, which means it has sequentially deposited seasonal sediment laminations called varves at the bottom; these allow for accurate dating of sediment cores and make Crawford Lake a prime site for archeological and geochemical studies. Using pollen analysis, reconstruction of the history of the area over several hundred years was possible. The pollen analysis revealed the agricultural history of the native Iroquoian Indians and the presence of a pre-European contact village.  The Wendat-Huron village has been reconstructed in the conservation area based on many years of work by archaeologists, historical references, and First Nation's oral traditions. Moreover, geochemical analysis of sediment cores has allowed for the reconstruction of the environmental history (e.g. human impact, pollution, etc.) of the area. For instance, some of this analysis has revealed the trends and sources of air pollution over approximately 150 years.

References

 Crawford Lake Trail and Village Guide, Conservation Halton, August 9, 2010

External links
Crawford Lake Conservation Area

Lakes of Ontario
Landforms of the Regional Municipality of Halton